The Wudong Bridge, also known as Xiaoyou Bridge and West Bridge, is a historic stone arch bridge over the West River in Huangyan District, Taizhou, Zhejiang, China.

History
The originally bridge was built by Zhang Yuanzhong during the era of Emperor Zhezong of the Song dynasty (960–1279), and named after his courtesy name "Xiaoyou". It was completely destroyed by a catastrophic flood in 1196. Local people Zhao Boyun donated property to rebuild the bridge and renamed it "Wudong Bridge". It became dilapidated for neglect through the following dynasties. In 1735 during the ruling of Yongzheng Emperor of the Qing dynasty (1644–1911), General Wu Jinyi, entrusted Shiyue, a Buddhist monk from Mingyin Temple, to rebuild the temple.

In December 1989, it has been the focus of the Government of Zhejiang as a provincial cultural heritage conservation unit.

Gallery

References

Bridges in Zhejiang
Arch bridges in China
Bridges completed in 1735
Qing dynasty architecture
Buildings and structures completed in 1735
1735 establishments in China